Tammy Witherspoon (born December 10, 1968) is an American politician, currently serving as mayor of Magnolia, Mississippi. She previously served in the Mississippi State Senate from the 38th district from 2016 to 2021.

References

1968 births
Living people
African-American state legislators in Mississippi
African-American women mayors
Mayors of places in Mississippi
Democratic Party Mississippi state senators
Women mayors of places in Mississippi
21st-century American women politicians
21st-century American politicians